Grant Douglas Lavigne (born August 27, 1999) is an American professional baseball first baseman in the Colorado Rockies organization.

Amateur career
Lavigne attended Bedford High School in Bedford, New Hampshire. As a sophomore, he was named New Hampshire's Gatorade Baseball Player of the Year after batting .543 with six home runs and 21 RBIs through 14 games. He was named the state's Gatorade Player of the Year once again as a senior. He committed to play college baseball at Wake Forest University.

Professional career
Lavigne was selected by the Colorado Rockies with the 42nd overall selection in the 2018 Major League Baseball draft. He signed with the Rockies for a $2 million signing bonus and was assigned to the Grand Junction Rockies of the Rookie-level Pioneer League. Over 59 games for Grand Junction, he slashed .350/.477/.519 with six home runs, 38 RBIs, and 12 stolen bases. Lavigne spent the 2019 season with the Asheville Tourists of the Class A South Atlantic League, batting .236/.347/.327 with seven home runs and 64 RBIs over 126 games.

Lavigne did not play a minor league game in 2020 due to the cancellation of the season. He split the 2021 season between the Fresno Grizzlies of the Low-A West and the Spokane Indians of the High-A West. Over 104 games between both teams, he slashed .264/.380/.412 with nine home runs, 58 RBIs, and 18 doubles.

References

External links

Living people
1999 births
People from Bedford, New Hampshire
Baseball first basemen
Baseball players from New Hampshire
Grand Junction Rockies players
Asheville Tourists players